The West Lake Corridor is an under-construction commuter rail line in Lake County, Indiana. New South Shore Line services will connect Chicago, Illinois and the cities of Hammond and Munster in Indiana.

History

New Start Studies
In mid-2000s, the population and commercial growth in Lake and Porter counties in Northwest Indiana was outstripping projections. The Northern Indiana Commuter Transportation District determined that if the growth continued, it would be necessary to add another branch to the South Shore Line commuter rail. In 2006, planning proceeded for an extension to Valparaiso, Indiana, but the project was deemed unqualified for federal funding, and the NICTD was unable to confidently attain trackage rights on the Canadian National Railway line to Valparaiso. By 2008 a new study indicated that the Valparaiso to Munster branch would not generate sufficient ridership and was dropped from the plan.

In 2017, the NICTD began demolition of houses between Hanover and Brunswick streets to begin building a new station, where trains would interchange with the main line.

Capital Investment Grant Program
In March 2019, the Federal Transit Administration (FTA) gave the project a favorable rating meaning the project could qualify for funding from the Capital Investment Grant Program. NICTD anticipated to be awarded funding the following spring with construction beginning later in the year. That October, the FTA approved the project moving it into its engineering phase.

Construction
A groundbreaking ceremony was held on October 28, 2020, which included the signing of a full funding grant between the FTA and NICTD.

Alignment

Traveling southbound, the new branch leaves the existing main line immediately before the current Hammond station. From Hammond south, the line follows the route of Monon Trail until it reaches Maynard Junction. The Monon Trail will be retained, but follow a new alignment. At Maynard Junction, the Corridor will have a flyover over the EJ&E/CSX tracks, and then will follow new tracks built immediately west of the CSX right-of-way.

Due to financial constraints, the initial segment will not extend to St. John or Lowell, but provisions will be made for future extension.

NICTD is not constructing a station serving Hammond's downtown area. However, as part of its plans to revitalize its downtown, the city of Hammond plans to itself construct a downtown station at Russel Street along a section of elevated track. While preparatory work is to be done coinciding with the construction of the West Lake Corridor, full construction on the station is not planned to begin until 2025, making the station an infill station to be built after the initial opening of the West Lake Corridor.

Planned stations
 
  (later infill station)

Service patterns 
The new line will directly serve Millennium Station at peak hours with shuttle service between Munster/Dyer and Hammond Gateway for connections to main line services at other times.

See also
 Monon Railroad
 Monon Trail

References

External links
West Lake Corridor
West Lake Corridor Project Map

 
Transportation in Chicago
Transportation in Indiana
Proposed railway lines in Illinois
Electric railways in Illinois
Electric railways in Indiana
2025 in rail transport